Parsons Music Group (also known as Parsons Music Corporation) is a musical instruments manufacturer and retailer based in Hong Kong, China.

Company profile 
Parsons was founded in 1986 by Terence and Arling Ng and became China's largest music retailer with more than 100 retail locations and 80 music schools all around the country. In its retail locations, Parsons sells acoustic and digital musical instruments including guitars, pianos, amplifiers, electronic keyboards, as well as sheet music and books.

Pianos 
Parsons manufactures pianos for its own brands (Yangtze River and Schönbrunn), grand pianos for Baldwin and manufactures a few Kawai models for sale only in Parsons Music's stores in China.

Parsons is the majority shareholder of the German piano manufacturers Wilh. Steinberg since 2013 and Grotrian-Steinweg since 2015.

References

External links 
 

Piano manufacturing companies
Musical instrument manufacturing companies of China
Manufacturing companies of Hong Kong
Music organisations based in Hong Kong
Retail companies of Hong Kong